Mariusz Trynkiewicz (born 10 April 1962 in Piotrków Trybunalski) is a Polish serial killer and sex offender, also known as the Satan from Piotrków or Trynki the Killer. In the late 1980’s he worked as a physical education teacher. For the murder of four boys in July 1988, he was sentenced to death, which was later replaced by 25 years of prison.

During military service, he kidnapped and raped a schoolboy, a military court sentenced him to one year of imprisonment with a two-year delay. A few weeks after this sentence was sentenced to 1.5 years imprisonment, later the term was increased to 2.5.

On 4 July 1988, after his release from prison in connection with the care of a sick mother, Trynkiewicz lured 13-year-old Wojciech Pryczek into his apartment, strangled him, and buried the corpse in the forest.

On 29 July 1988 Trynkiewicz lured to his apartment and killed 11-year-old Tomasz Łojek, 12-year-old Artur Krawczyński and Krzysztof Kaczmarek. A few days later, he carried their bodies into the woods and set them on fire. Their bodies were later discovered by a mushroom picker.

During the trial, Trynkiewicz was found to be sane, and his behavior was marked by the realization of sadism and sexual attraction combined with algolagnia. On 29 September 1989 Trynkiewicz was sentenced to four death sentences for every murder. In the same year, after the amnesty, the term was changed to 25 years imprisonment. On 11 February 2014 he was released. On 3 March 2014 by a court decision it was decided to isolate him at the resort Gostynin.

In 2015 he received a new term (5 years and 6 months) for the storage of child pornography.

References

External links
 Prokurator. Kobieta, która nie bała się morderców

1962 births
1988 crimes in Poland
1988 murders in Europe
1980s murders in Poland
20th-century Polish criminals
Living people
Male serial killers
People convicted of murder by Poland
People from Piotrków Trybunalski
Polish murderers of children
Polish people convicted of murder
Polish rapists
Polish serial killers
Violence against men in Europe